Punyamurthula Anant, known by his stage name Ananth Babu, is an Indian actor and comedian, known for his works predominantly in Telugu cinema. He is the brother of noted comedians Raja Babu and Chitti Babu.

Personal life 
Ananth Babu was born in Injaram, Andhra Pradesh, to Punyamurthula Umamaheswara Rao and Ramanamma. Ananth Babu did his schooling in Rajahmundry, Andhra Pradesh. He is a graduate in commerce (B.com)

Filmography 
Ananth Babu acted in more than 380 films. Below are his selected filmography.

References

External links 
 MaaStars.com
 Comedian Ananth Babu Exclusive Interview

Telugu male actors
Telugu comedians
Indian male comedians
Indian male film actors
Living people
Year of birth missing (living people)
People from East Godavari district
Male actors from Andhra Pradesh
21st-century Indian male actors
20th-century Indian male actors